El Ejido (also known as El Egido), is neighbourhood of León, Spain.

Located in the east part of the city, between the streets Miguel Zaera and Alcalde Miguel Castaño, it emerged during the fifties as a neighbourhood around the parish of Jesús Divino Obrero. Nowadays, the newer part includes the parish of Santo Toribio de Mogrovejo. Its most outstanding avenue is Jose María Fernández, although streets such as Pendón de Baeza or Daoíz y Velarde are of some importance as well.

El Ejido spreads in an area of about half a square kilometer, being home to 11,000 inhabitants. The closest part to the city centre is visibly older than the rest.

Historically, Ejido comes from Latin Exitus, which means exit. This refers to the position of the area in the outskirts of the city.

There is a local football team, Club Deportivo El Ejido.

León, Spain
Neighbourhoods in Spain